Bulawayo Thermal Power Station is a  coal-fired thermal power plant located in the city of Bulawayo in Bulawayo District in the Matabeleland Province of Zimbabwe.

Location
The coordinates of the power station are:20°09'33.0"S, 28°34'33.0"E (Latitude:-20.159167; Longitude:28.575833).

Overview
The power station is owned and operated by Zimbabwe Power Company, (ZPC), a parastatal of the Government of Zimbabwe. ZPC is a 100 percent subsidiary of Zimbabwe Electricity Supply Authority. The station was constructed between 1947 and 1957 by Bulawayo Municipal Council. At that time, generation capacity was 120 megawatts. 

The plant uses coal, primarily from Hwange Colliery, which is brought in by rail and road. In 1999, the power station underwent a major overhaul and modernization repairs, which reduced generation capacity to 90 megawatts. As of 2019, the generation capacity had deteriorated to about 30 megawatts, due to antiquated equipment and lack of maintenance for many years.

Upgrade
In 2019, the Zimbabwean government publicly announced its intentions to overhaul, refurbish and modernize the power station, so that it would generate 90 megawatts again. Two of the six cooling towers will be demolished in the process. The remaining four cooling towers will be refurbished to prolong their life span by another 15 to 20 years.

In November 2018, the Government of India extended a line of credit worth US$333 million to the government of Zimbabwe, of which US$23 million was to fund the upgrade to Bulawayo Thermal Power Station.

See also

List of power stations in Zimbabwe

References

External links
  Demolition of Bulawayo Power Station Cooling Towers 1 & 2 As of 20 June 2019.

Coal-fired power stations in Zimbabwe
Bulawayo
Energy infrastructure completed in 1957